Tin Široki (born 29 April 1987) is a Croatian alpine skier. He competed in the men's combined at the 2006 Winter Olympics.

World Cup results

Season standings

Results per discipline

World Championship results

Olympic results

References

1987 births
Living people
Croatian male alpine skiers
Olympic alpine skiers of Croatia
Alpine skiers at the 2006 Winter Olympics
Sportspeople from Zagreb